Psophodidae is a family of passerine birds native to Australia and nearby areas. It has a complicated taxonomic history and different authors vary in which birds they include in the family. In the strictest sense, it includes only the 5 or 6 species of whipbirds and wedgebills (Psophodes and Androphobus), but some authors also include the quail-thrushes (Cinclosoma), 8 species of ground-dwelling birds found in Australia and New Guinea, and the jewel-babblers (Ptilorrhoa), 3 or 4 species found in rainforest in New Guinea. Others place them in their own family, the Cinclosomatidae.  The Malaysian rail-babbler (Eupetes macrocerus) was formerly sometimes placed in this family, which would then be called Eupetidae.

Taxonomy
The quail-thrushes, jewel-babblers, whipbirds and wedgebills were traditionally included with the logrunners (Orthonyx) in the family Orthonychidae. Sometimes the Malaysian rail-babbler and blue-capped ifrit (Ifrita kowaldi) were also included in the family. In 1985, Sibley and Ahlquist found that the logrunners were not related to the others and included only the logrunners in the Orthonychidae. They treated the others as the subfamily Cinclosomatinae within their expanded family Corvidae.

A number of authors later treated the quail-thrushes and allies as the family Cinclosomatidae, a name first coined by Gregory Mathews in 1921–1922. However, if the whipbirds are included in the family, the older name Psophodidae Bonaparte, 1854 has priority. If the Malaysian rail-babbler is also included, the name Eupetidae Bonaparte, 1850 has priority.

The Malaysian rail-babbler has now been shown to be unrelated to the others, probably being an early offshoot of the Passerida. Another study found the quail-thrushes and jewel-babblers to be related to each other but did not show them to have a close relationship with Psophodes or Ifrita.

Description
Whipbirds and wedgebills are 19–31 cm long. They are mainly olive-green or brown in colour and have a crest.

Distribution and habitat
The whipbirds and wedgebills are all found in Australia, occurring in a range of habitats from rainforest to arid scrub. The western whipbird is considered to be near-threatened because of habitat loss and fires while the Papuan whipbird is classed as data deficient.

Behaviour

They are terrestrial birds which fly fairly weakly and prefer to squat or run when disturbed. They forage on the ground feeding mainly on insects and other invertebrates. In the desert, quail-thrushes also eat some seeds.

They build a cup-shaped nest among shrubs or on the ground. Two or three eggs are laid.

Species list

 Genus Androphobus
 Papuan whipbird, Androphobus viridis
 Genus Psophodes
 Eastern whipbird, Psophodes olivaceus
 Black-throated whipbird, Psophodes nigrogularis
 White-bellied whipbird, Psophodes leucogaster
 Chiming wedgebill, Psophodes occidentalis
 Chirruping wedgebill, Psophodes cristatus

References

 
Bird families
^
Passeri
Taxa named by Charles Lucien Bonaparte